Ectopic pregnancy is a complication of pregnancy in which the embryo attaches outside the uterus. Signs and symptoms classically include abdominal pain and vaginal bleeding, but fewer than 50 percent of affected women have both of these symptoms. The pain may be described as sharp, dull, or crampy. Pain may also spread to the shoulder if bleeding into the abdomen has occurred. Severe bleeding may result in a fast heart rate, fainting, or shock. With very rare exceptions the fetus is unable to survive.

Overall, ectopic pregnancies annually affect less than 2% of pregnancies worldwide.
Risk factors for ectopic pregnancy include pelvic inflammatory disease, often due to chlamydia infection; tobacco smoking; prior tubal surgery; a history of infertility; and the use of assisted reproductive technology. Those who have previously had an ectopic pregnancy are at much higher risk of having another one. Most ectopic pregnancies (90%) occur in the fallopian tube, which are known as tubal pregnancies, but implantation can also occur on the cervix, ovaries, caesarean scar, or within the abdomen. Detection of ectopic pregnancy is typically by blood tests for human chorionic gonadotropin (hCG) and ultrasound. This may require testing on more than one occasion. Ultrasound works best when performed from within the vagina. Other causes of similar symptoms include: miscarriage, ovarian torsion, and acute appendicitis.

Prevention is by decreasing risk factors such as chlamydia infections through screening and treatment. While some ectopic pregnancies will miscarry without treatment, the standard treatment for ectopic pregnancy is an abortion. The use of the medication methotrexate works as well as surgery in some cases. Specifically it works well when the beta-HCG is low and the size of the ectopic is small. Surgery such as a salpingectomy is still typically recommended if the tube has ruptured, there is a fetal heartbeat, or the woman's vital signs are unstable. The surgery may be laparoscopic or through a larger incision, known as a laparotomy. Maternal morbidity and mortality are reduced with treatment.

The rate of ectopic pregnancy is about 11 to 20 per 1,000 live births in developed countries, though it may be as high as 4% among those using assisted reproductive technology. It is the most common cause of death among women during the first trimester at approximately 6-13% of the total. In the developed world outcomes have improved while in the developing world they often remain poor. The risk of death among those in the developed world is between 0.1 and 0.3 percent while in the developing world it is between one and three percent. The first known description of an ectopic pregnancy is by Al-Zahrawi in the 11th century. The word "ectopic" means "out of place".

Signs and symptoms 

Up to 10% of women with ectopic pregnancy have no symptoms, and one-third have no medical signs. In many cases the symptoms have low specificity, and can be similar to those of other genitourinary and gastrointestinal disorders, such as appendicitis, salpingitis, rupture of a corpus luteum cyst, miscarriage, ovarian torsion or urinary tract infection. Clinical presentation of ectopic pregnancy occurs at a mean of 7.2 weeks after the last normal menstrual period, with a range of four to eight weeks. Later presentations are more common in communities deprived of modern diagnostic ability.

Signs and symptoms of ectopic pregnancy include increased hCG, vaginal bleeding (in varying amounts), sudden lower abdominal pain, pelvic pain, a tender cervix, an adnexal mass, or adnexal tenderness. In the absence of ultrasound or hCG assessment, heavy vaginal bleeding may lead to a misdiagnosis of miscarriage. Nausea, vomiting and diarrhea are more rare symptoms of ectopic pregnancy.

Rupture of an ectopic pregnancy can lead to symptoms such as abdominal distension, tenderness, peritonism and hypovolemic shock. A woman with ectopic pregnancy may be excessively mobile with upright posturing, in order to decrease intrapelvic blood flow, which can lead to swelling of the abdominal cavity and cause additional pain.

Complications 

The most common complication is rupture with internal bleeding which may lead to hypovolemic shock. Damage to the fallopian tubes can lead to difficulty becoming pregnant in the future. The woman's other fallopian tube may function sufficiently for pregnancy. After the removal of one damaged fallopian tube, pregnancy remains possible in the future. If both are removed, in-vitro fertilization remains an option for women hoping to become pregnant.

Causes 

There are a number of risk factors for ectopic pregnancies. However, in as many as one-third to one-half no risk factors can be identified. Risk factors include: pelvic inflammatory disease, infertility, use of an intrauterine device (IUD), previous exposure to diethylstilbestrol (DES), tubal surgery, intrauterine surgery (e.g. D&C), smoking, previous ectopic pregnancy, endometriosis, and tubal ligation. A previous induced abortion does not appear to increase the risk. The IUD does not increase the risk of ectopic pregnancy, but with an IUD if pregnancy occurs it is more likely to be ectopic than intrauterine. The risk of ectopic pregnancy after chlamydia infection is low. The exact mechanism through which chlamydia increases the risk of ectopic pregnancy is uncertain, though some research suggests that the infection can affect the structure of fallopian tubes.

Tube damage 

Tubal pregnancy is when the egg is implanted in the fallopian tubes. Hair-like cilia located on the internal surface of the fallopian tubes carry the fertilized egg to the uterus. Fallopian cilia are sometimes seen in reduced numbers subsequent to an ectopic pregnancy, leading to a hypothesis that cilia damage in the fallopian tubes is likely to lead to an ectopic pregnancy. Women who smoke have a higher chance of an ectopic pregnancy in the fallopian tubes. Smoking leads to risk factors of damaging and destroying cilia. As cilia degenerate, the amount of time it takes for the fertilized egg to reach the uterus will increase. The fertilized egg, if it does not reach the uterus in time, will hatch from the non-adhesive zona pellucida and implant itself inside the fallopian tube, thus causing the ectopic pregnancy.

Women with pelvic inflammatory disease (PID) have a high occurrence of ectopic pregnancy. This results from the build-up of scar tissue in the fallopian tubes, causing damage to cilia. However, if both tubes were completely blocked, so that sperm and egg were physically unable to meet, then fertilization of the egg would naturally be impossible, and neither normal pregnancy nor ectopic pregnancy could occur. Intrauterine adhesions (IUA) present in Asherman's syndrome can cause ectopic cervical pregnancy or, if adhesions partially block access to the tubes via the ostia, ectopic tubal pregnancy. Asherman's syndrome usually occurs from intrauterine surgery, most commonly after D&C.  Endometrial/pelvic/genital tuberculosis, another cause of Asherman's syndrome, can also lead to ectopic pregnancy as infection may lead to tubal adhesions in addition to intrauterine adhesions.

Tubal ligation can predispose to ectopic pregnancy. Reversal of tubal sterilization (tubal reversal) carries a risk for ectopic pregnancy. This is higher if more destructive methods of tubal ligation (tubal cautery, partial removal of the tubes) have been used than less destructive methods (tubal clipping). A history of a tubal pregnancy increases the risk of future occurrences to about 10%. This risk is not reduced by removing the affected tube, even if the other tube appears normal. The best method for diagnosing this is to do an early ultrasound.

Other 

Although some investigations have shown that patients may be at higher risk for ectopic pregnancy with advancing age, it is believed that age is a variable which could act as a surrogate for other risk factors. Vaginal douching is thought by some to increase ectopic pregnancies. Women exposed to DES in utero (also known as "DES daughters") also have an elevated risk of ectopic pregnancy. However, DES has not been used since 1971 in the United States. It has also been suggested that pathologic generation of nitric oxide through increased iNOS production may decrease tubal ciliary beats and smooth muscle contractions and thus affect embryo transport, which may consequently result in ectopic pregnancy. The low socioeconomic status may be risk factors for ectopic pregnancy.

Diagnosis 

An ectopic pregnancy should be considered as the cause of abdominal pain or vaginal bleeding in every woman who has a positive pregnancy test. The primary goal of diagnostic procedures in possible ectopic pregnancy is to triage according to risk rather than establishing pregnancy location.

Transvaginal ultrasonography 

An ultrasound showing a gestational sac with fetal heart in the fallopian tube has a very high specificity of ectopic pregnancy. It involves a long, thin transducer, covered with the conducting gel and a plastic/latex sheath and inserted into the vagina. Transvaginal ultrasonography has a sensitivity of at least 90% for ectopic pregnancy. The diagnostic ultrasonographic finding in ectopic pregnancy is an adnexal mass that moves separately from the ovary. In around 60% of cases, it is an inhomogeneous or a noncystic adnexal mass sometimes known as the "blob sign". It is generally spherical, but a more tubular appearance may be seen in case of hematosalpinx. This sign has been estimated to have a sensitivity of 84% and specificity of 99% in diagnosing ectopic pregnancy. In the study estimating these values, the blob sign had a positive predictive value of 96% and a negative predictive value of 95%. The visualization of an empty extrauterine gestational sac is sometimes known as the "bagel sign", and is present in around 20% of cases. In another 20% of cases, there is visualization of a gestational sac containing a yolk sac or an embryo. Ectopic pregnancies where there is visualization of cardiac activity are sometimes termed "viable ectopic".

The combination of a positive pregnancy test and the presence of what appears to be a normal intrauterine pregnancy does not exclude an ectopic pregnancy, since there may be either a heterotopic pregnancy or a "", which is a collection of within the endometrial cavity that may be seen in up to 20% of women.

A small amount of anechogenic-free fluid in the recto-uterine pouch is commonly found in both intrauterine and ectopic pregnancies. The presence of echogenic fluid is estimated at between 28 and 56% of women with an ectopic pregnancy, and strongly indicates the presence of hemoperitoneum. However, it does not necessarily result from tubal rupture but is commonly a result from leakage from the distal tubal opening. As a rule of thumb, the finding of free fluid is significant if it reaches the fundus or is present in the vesico-uterine pouch. A further marker of serious intra-abdominal bleeding is the presence of fluid in the hepatorenal recess of the subhepatic space.

Currently, Doppler ultrasonography is not considered to significantly contribute to the diagnosis of ectopic pregnancy.

A common misdiagnosis is of a normal intrauterine pregnancy is where the pregnancy is implanted laterally in an arcuate uterus, potentially being misdiagnosed as an interstitial pregnancy.

Ultrasonography and β-hCG 

Where no intrauterine pregnancy (IUP) is seen on ultrasound, measuring β-human chorionic gonadotropin (β-hCG) levels may aid in the diagnosis. The rationale is that a low β-hCG level may indicate that the pregnancy is intrauterine but yet too small to be visible on ultrasonography. While some physicians consider that the threshold where an intrauterine pregnancy should be visible on transvaginal ultrasound is around 1500 mIU/mL of β-hCG, a review in the JAMA Rational Clinical Examination Series showed that there is no single threshold for the β-human chorionic gonadotropin that confirms an ectopic pregnancy.  Instead, the best test in a pregnant woman is a high resolution transvaginal ultrasound. The presence of an adnexal mass in the absence of an intrauterine pregnancy on transvaginal sonography increases the likelihood of an ectopic pregnancy 100-fold (LR+ 111).  When there are no adnexal abnormalities on transvaginal sonography, the likelihood of an ectopic pregnancy decreases (LR- 0.12). An empty uterus with levels higher than 1500 mIU/mL may be evidence of an ectopic pregnancy, but may also be consistent with an intrauterine pregnancy which is simply too small to be seen on ultrasound. If the diagnosis is uncertain, it may be necessary to wait a few days and repeat the blood work. This can be done by measuring the β-hCG level approximately 48 hours later and repeating the ultrasound. The serum hCG ratios and logistic regression models appear to be better than absolute single serum hCG level. If the β-hCG falls on repeat examination, this strongly suggests a spontaneous abortion or rupture. The fall in serum hCG over 48 hours may be measured as the hCG ratio, which is calculated as:

An hCG ratio of 0.87, that is, a decrease in hCG of 13% over 48 hours, has a sensitivity of 93% and specificity of 97% for predicting a failing pregnancy of unknown location (PUL). The majority of cases of ectopic pregnancy will have serial serum hCG levels that increase more slowly than would be expected with an IUP (that is, a suboptimal rise), or decrease more slowly than would be expected with a failing PUL. However, up to 20% of cases of ectopic pregnancy have serum hCG doubling times similar to that of an IUP, and around 10% of EP cases have hCG patterns similar to a failing PUL.

Other methods

Direct examination 
A laparoscopy or laparotomy can also be performed to visually confirm an ectopic pregnancy. This is generally reserved for women presenting with signs of an acute abdomen and hypovolemic shock. Often if a tubal abortion or tubal rupture has occurred, it is difficult to find the pregnancy tissue. A laparoscopy in very early ectopic pregnancy rarely shows a normal-looking fallopian tube.

Culdocentesis 
Culdocentesis, in which fluid is retrieved from the space separating the vagina and rectum, is a less commonly performed test that may be used to look for internal bleeding. In this test, a needle is inserted into the space at the very top of the vagina, behind the uterus and in front of the rectum. Any blood or fluid found may have been derived from a ruptured ectopic pregnancy.

Progesterone levels 
Progesterone levels of less than 20 nmol/L have a high predictive value for failing pregnancies, whilst levels over 25 nmol/L are likely to predict viable pregnancies, and levels over 60 nmol/L are strongly so. This may help in identifying failing PUL that are at low risk and thereby needing less follow-up. Inhibin A may also be useful for predicting spontaneous resolution of PUL, but is not as good as progesterone for this purpose.

Mathematical models 
There are various mathematical models, such as logistic regression models and Bayesian networks, for the prediction of PUL outcome based on multiple parameters. Mathematical models also aim to identify PULs that are low risk, that is, failing PULs and IUPs.

Dilation and curettage 
Dilation and curettage (D&C) is sometimes used to diagnose pregnancy location with the aim of differentiating between an EP and a non-viable IUP in situations where a viable IUP can be ruled out. Specific indications for this procedure include either of the following:
 No visible IUP on transvaginal ultrasonography with a serum hCG of more than 2000 mIU/mL.
 An abnormal rise in hCG level.  A rise of 35% over 48 hours is proposed as the minimal rise consistent with a viable intrauterine pregnancy.
 An abnormal fall in hCG level, such as defined as one of less than 20% in two days.

Classification

Tubal pregnancy 

The vast majority of ectopic pregnancies implant in the fallopian tube. Pregnancies can grow in the fimbrial end (5% of all ectopic pregnancies), the ampullary section (80%), the isthmus (12%), and the cornual and interstitial part of the tube (2%). Mortality of a tubal pregnancy at the isthmus or within the uterus (interstitial pregnancy) is higher as there is increased vascularity that may result more likely in sudden major internal bleeding. A review published in 2010 supports the hypothesis that tubal ectopic pregnancy is caused by a combination of retention of the embryo within the fallopian tube due to impaired embryo-tubal transport and alterations in the tubal environment allowing early implantation to occur.

Nontubal ectopic pregnancy 

Two percent of ectopic pregnancies occur in the ovary, cervix, or are intra-abdominal. Transvaginal ultrasound examination is usually able to detect a cervical pregnancy. An ovarian pregnancy is differentiated from a tubal pregnancy by the Spiegelberg criteria.

While a fetus of ectopic pregnancy is typically not viable, very rarely, a live baby has been delivered from an abdominal pregnancy. In such a situation the placenta sits on the intra-abdominal organs or the peritoneum and has found sufficient blood supply. This is generally bowel or mesentery, but other sites, such as the renal (kidney), liver or hepatic (liver) artery or even aorta have been described. Support to near viability has occasionally been described, but even in Third World countries, the diagnosis is most commonly made at 16 to 20 weeks' gestation. Such a fetus would have to be delivered by laparotomy. Maternal morbidity and mortality from extrauterine pregnancy are high as attempts to remove the placenta from the organs to which it is attached usually lead to uncontrollable bleeding from the attachment site. If the organ to which the placenta is attached is removable, such as a section of bowel, then the placenta should be removed together with that organ. This is such a rare occurrence that true data is unavailable and reliance must be made on anecdotal reports. However, the vast majority of abdominal pregnancies require intervention well before fetal viability because of the risk of bleeding.

With the increase in Cesarean sections performed worldwide, Cesarean section ectopic pregnancies (CSP) are rare, but becoming more common. The incidence of CSP is not well known, however there have been estimates based on different populations of 1:1800–1:2216. CSP are characterized by abnormal implantation into the scar from a previous cesarean section, and allowed to continue can cause serious complications such as uterine rupture and hemorrhage. Patients with CSP generally present without symptoms, however symptoms can include vaginal bleeding that may or may not be associated with pain. The diagnosis of CSP is made by ultrasound and four characteristics are noted: (1) Empty uterine cavity with bright hyperechoic endometrial stripe (2) Empty cervical canal (3) Intrauterine mass in the anterior part of the uterine isthmus, and (4) Absence of the anterior uterine muscle layer, and/or absence or thinning between the bladder and gestational sac, measuring less than 5 mm. Given the rarity of the diagnosis, treatment options tend to be described in case reports and series, ranging from medical with methotrexate or KCl to surgical with dilation and curettage, uterine wedge resection, or hysterectomy. A double-balloon catheter technique has also been described, allowing for uterine preservation. Recurrence risk for CSP is unknown, and early ultrasound in the next pregnancy is recommended.

Heterotopic pregnancy 

In rare cases of ectopic pregnancy, there may be two fertilized eggs, one outside the uterus and the other inside. This is called a heterotopic pregnancy. Often the intrauterine pregnancy is discovered later than the ectopic, mainly because of the painful emergency nature of ectopic pregnancies. Since ectopic pregnancies are normally discovered and removed very early in the pregnancy, an ultrasound may not find the additional pregnancy inside the uterus. When hCG levels continue to rise after the removal of the ectopic pregnancy, there is the chance that a pregnancy inside the uterus is still viable. This is normally discovered through an ultrasound.

Although rare, heterotopic pregnancies are becoming more common, likely due to increased use of IVF. The survival rate of the uterine fetus of a heterotopic pregnancy is around 70%.

Rudimentary horn pregnancy 

A pregnancy in a rudimentary horn refers to a rare and life-threatening condition that occurs when a fertilized egg implants inside the small rudimentary horn of a unicornuate uterus, which is a type of congenital uterine abnormality caused by the incomplete development of one of the Müllerian ducts. This type of ectopic pregnancy is often results in rupture of the rudimentary horn between 10 and 15 weeks of gestation, leading to a high risk of morbidity and mortality.

Persistent ectopic pregnancy 

A persistent ectopic pregnancy refers to the continuation of trophoblastic growth after a surgical intervention to remove an ectopic pregnancy. After a conservative procedure that attempts to preserve the affected fallopian tube such as a salpingotomy, in about 15–20% the major portion of the ectopic growth may have been removed, but some trophoblastic tissue, perhaps deeply embedded, has escaped removal and continues to grow, generating a new rise in hCG levels. After weeks this may lead to new clinical symptoms including bleeding. For this reason hCG levels may have to be monitored after removal of an ectopic pregnancy to assure their decline, also methotrexate can be given at the time of surgery prophylactically.

Pregnancy of unknown location 

Pregnancy of unknown location (PUL) is the term used for a pregnancy where there is a positive pregnancy test but no pregnancy has been visualized using transvaginal ultrasonography. Specialized early pregnancy departments have estimated that between 8% and 10% of women attending for an ultrasound assessment in early pregnancy will be classified as having a PUL. The true nature of the pregnancy can be an ongoing viable intrauterine pregnancy, a failed pregnancy, an ectopic pregnancy or rarely a persisting PUL.

Because of frequent ambiguity on ultrasonography examinations, the following classification is proposed:

In women with a pregnancy of unknown location, between 6% and 20% have an ectopic pregnancy. In cases of pregnancy of unknown location and a history of heavy bleeding, it has been estimated that approximately 6% have an underlying ectopic pregnancy. Between 30% and 47% of women with pregnancy of unknown location are ultimately diagnosed with an ongoing intrauterine pregnancy, whereof the majority  (50–70%) will be found to have failing pregnancies where the location is never confirmed.

 is where the hCG level does not spontaneously decline and no intrauterine or ectopic pregnancy is identified on follow-up transvaginal ultrasonography. A persisting PUL is likely either a small ectopic pregnancy that has not been visualized, or a retained trophoblast in the endometrial cavity. Treatment should only be considered when a potentially viable intrauterine pregnancy has been definitively excluded. A treated persistent PUL is defined as one managed medically (generally with methotrexate) without confirmation of the location of the pregnancy such as by ultrasound, laparoscopy or uterine evacuation. A resolved persistent PUL is defined as serum hCG reaching a non-pregnant value (generally less than 5 IU/L) after expectant management, or after uterine evacuation without evidence of chorionic villi on histopathological examination. In contrast, a relatively low and unresolving level of serum hCG indicates the possibility of an hCG-secreting tumour.

Differential diagnosis 

Other conditions that cause similar symptoms include: miscarriage, ovarian torsion, and acute appendicitis, ruptured ovarian cyst, kidney stone, and pelvic inflammatory disease, among others.

Treatment

Expectant management 

Most women with a PUL are followed up with serum hCG measurements and repeat TVS examinations until a final diagnosis is confirmed. Low-risk cases of PUL that appear to be failing pregnancies may be followed up with a urinary pregnancy test after two weeks and get subsequent telephone advice. Low-risk cases of PUL that are likely intrauterine pregnancies may have another TVS in two weeks to access viability. High-risk cases of PUL require further assessment, either with a TVS within 48 h or additional hCG measurement.

Medical 

Early treatment of an ectopic pregnancy with methotrexate is a viable alternative to surgical treatment which was developed in the 1980s. If administered early in the pregnancy, methotrexate terminates the growth of the developing embryo; this may cause an abortion, or the developing embryo may then be either resorbed by the woman's body or pass with a menstrual period.  Contraindications include liver, kidney, or blood disease, as well as an ectopic embryonic mass > 3.5 cm.

Also, it may lead to the inadvertent termination of an undetected intrauterine pregnancy, or severe abnormality in any surviving pregnancy. Therefore, it is recommended that methotrexate should only be administered when hCG has been serially monitored with a rise less than 35% over 48 hours, which practically excludes a viable intrauterine pregnancy.

For nontubal ectopic pregnancy, evidence from randomised clinical trials in women with CSP is uncertain regarding treatment success, complications and side effects of methotrexate compared with surgery (uterine arterial embolization or uterine arterial chemoembolization).

The United States uses a multi dose protocol of methotrexate (MTX) which involves four doses of intramuscular along with an intramuscular injection of folinic acid to protect cells from the effects of the drugs and to reduce side effects. In France, the single dose protocol is followed, but a single dose has a greater chance of failure.

Surgery

If bleeding has already occurred, surgical intervention may be necessary. However, whether to pursue surgical intervention is an often difficult decision in a stable patient with minimal evidence of blood clot on ultrasound.

Surgeons use laparoscopy or laparotomy to gain access to the pelvis and can either incise the affected Fallopian tube and remove only the pregnancy (salpingostomy) or remove the affected tube with the pregnancy (salpingectomy). The first successful surgery for an ectopic pregnancy was performed by Robert Lawson Tait in 1883. It is estimated that an acceptable rate of PULs that eventually undergo surgery is between 0.5 and 11%. People that undergo salpingectomy and salpingostomy have a similar recurrent ectopic pregnancy rate of 5% and 8% respectively. Additionally, their intrauterine pregnancy rates are also similar, 56% and 61%.

Autotransfusion of a woman's own blood as drained during surgery may be useful in those who have a lot of bleeding into their abdomen.

Published reports that a re-implanted embryo survived to birth were debunked as false.

Prognosis 

When ectopic pregnancies are treated, the prognosis for the mother is very good in Western countries; maternal death is rare, but all fetuses die or are aborted. For instance, in the UK, between 2003 and 2005 there were 32,100 ectopic pregnancies resulting in 10 maternal deaths (meaning that 1 in 3,210 women with an ectopic pregnancy died). In 2006–2008 the UK Confidential Enquiry into Maternal Deaths found that ectopic pregnancy is the cause of 6 maternal deaths (0.26/100,000 pregnancies).

In the developing world, however, especially in Africa, the death rate is very high, and ectopic pregnancies are a major cause of death among women of childbearing age.

In women having had an ectopic pregnancy, the risk of another one in the next pregnancy is around 10%.

Future fertility 

Fertility following ectopic pregnancy depends upon several factors, the most important of which is a prior history of infertility. The treatment choice does not play a major role; a randomized study in 2013 concluded that the rates of intrauterine pregnancy two years after treatment of ectopic pregnancy are approximately 64% with radical surgery, 67% with medication, and 70% with conservative surgery. In comparison, the cumulative pregnancy rate of women under 40 years of age in the general population over two years is over 90%.

Methotrexate does not affect future fertility treatments. The number of oocytes that were retrieved before and after treatment with methotrexate does not change.

In case of ovarian ectopic pregnancy, the risk of subsequent ectopic pregnancy or infertility is low.

There is no evidence that massage improves fertility after ectopic pregnancy.

Epidemiology 

The rate of ectopic pregnancy is about 1% and 2% of that of live births in developed countries, though it is as high as 4% in pregnancies involving assisted reproductive technology. Between 93% and 97% of ectopic pregnancies are located in a fallopian tube. Of these, in turn, 13% are located in the isthmus, 75% are located in the ampulla, and 12% in the fimbriae. Ectopic pregnancy is responsible for 6% of maternal deaths during the first trimester of pregnancy making it the leading cause of maternal death during this stage of pregnancy.

Between 5% and 42% of women seen for ultrasound assessment with a positive pregnancy test have a pregnancy of unknown location, that is a positive pregnancy test but no pregnancy visualized at transvaginal ultrasonography. Between 6% and 20% of pregnancy of unknown location are subsequently diagnosed with actual ectopic pregnancy.

Society and culture 

Salpingectomy as a treatment for ectopic pregnancy is one of the common cases when the principle of double effect can be used to justify accelerating the death of the embryo by doctors and patients opposed to outright abortions.

In the Catholic Church, there are moral debates on certain treatments.  A significant number of Catholic moralists consider use of methotrexate and the salpingostomy procedure to be not "morally permissible" because they destroy the embryo; however, situations are considered differently in which the mother's health is endangered, and the whole fallopian tube with the developing embryo inside is removed.

Organisations exist that provide information and support to help those who experience ectopic pregnancy. Studies show that people can experience post-traumatic stress, depression, and anxiety for which they would need specialist therapies. Partners can also experience post-traumatic stress.

Live birth 

There have been cases where ectopic pregnancy lasted many months and ended in a live baby delivered by laparotomy.

In July 1999, Lori Dalton gave birth by caesarean section in Ogden, Utah, United States, to a healthy baby girl, Saige, who had developed outside of the uterus. Previous ultrasounds had not discovered the problem. "[Dalton]'s delivery was slated as a routine Caesarean birth at Ogden Regional Medical Center in Utah. When Dr. Naisbitt performed Lori's Caesarean, he was astonished to find Saige within the amniotic membrane outside the womb ... ." "But what makes this case so rare is that not only did mother and baby survive—they're both in perfect health. The father, John Dalton took home video inside the delivery room. Saige came out doing extremely well because even though she had been implanted outside the womb, a rich blood supply from a uterine fibroid along the outer uterus wall had nourished her with a rich source of blood."

In September 1999 an English woman, Jane Ingram (age 32) gave birth to triplets: Olivia, Mary and Ronan, with an extrauterine fetus (Ronan) below the womb and twins in the womb. All three survived. The twins in the womb were taken out first.

On May 29, 2008, an Australian woman, Meera Thangarajah (age 34), who had an ectopic pregnancy in the ovary, gave birth to a healthy full term 6 pound 3 ounce (2.8 kg) baby girl, Durga, via Caesarean section. She had no problems or complications during the 38‑week pregnancy.

Animals 

Ectopic gestation exists in mammals other than humans. In sheep, it can go to term, with mammary preparation to parturition, and expulsion efforts. The fetus can be removed by caesarean section. Pictures of caesarian section of a euthanized ewe, five days after parturition signs.

See also 
 Indirect abortion

References

External links 

 CT of the abdomen showing abdominal ectopic pregnancy

 
Wikipedia articles with sections published in WikiJournal of Medicine
Medical emergencies
Health issues in pregnancy
Wikipedia medicine articles ready to translate
Acute pain